José Ernesto "Pichy" Torres Zamora (born June 7, 1971) is a Puerto Rican politician and former Secretary General of the New Progressive Party (PNP). He was a member of the Puerto Rico House of Representatives from June 10, 2010, when he replaced Iris Miriam Ruíz, until 2013. He won a seat in the PR House of Representatives in 2016 and currently he serves as the Speaker Pro Tempore of the Puerto Rico House of Representatives.

Early years and studies

José Ernesto Torres Zamora was born in Jayuya on June 7, 1971 to Monsita Zamora González and Ernesto Torres Torres. He is the oldest of three children. His parents were founders of the New Progressive Party in Jayuya.

Torres Zamora graduated with honors from Josefina León Zayas High School. He was also president of his class in 1988. After that, he studied at the University of Puerto Rico at Mayagüez, where he completed a Bachelor's degree in Chemical Engineering, graduating Cum Laude. Torres Zamora completed post-secondary studies at the Polytechnic University of Puerto Rico where he completed a master's degree on Environmental Management and a master's degree on Engineering Management, graduating with summa cum laude.

Currently Torres Zamora is studying for a Juris Doctor Degree at the Puerto Rico Law School, in his fifth year.

Professional career

Torres Zamora is a Licensed Professional Engineer and worked for 15 years in the private sector specifically at Baxter Healthcare Corporation in its operation at Jayuya Puerto Rico. At the facility he worked at the Quality and Engineering areas. He directed at once the Environmental Engineering, Health and Safety, Plant Engineering, Utility, Security and Maintenance areas.

Under his leadership the Baxter Jayuya was awarded several times with the Best Environmental Program Award for Baxter Global and Puerto Rico Manufacturing Association Environmental Best Program Awards several times. He was awarded by the Environmental Protection Agency with the National Performance Awards on 2003. He manage to achieve the certifications of ISO 14001 Environmental Compliance and ISO 18001 Heath and Safety for the facility.

His leadership was recognized by Baxter Corporate several times been of the few Plant Engineers serving as an Environmental Health and Safety auditors used in facilities in Mexico, Costa Rica, Republica Dominicana, Illinois, Indiana, North Carolina and Memphis.

Political career

Since his youth, Torres Zamora showed a penchant for leadership. In 1991, he was Vice President of the PNP Youth in Jayuya. In 2001, he was vice president, and then President of the PNP in Jayuya. From 2005 to 2008, he was elected to the Municipal Assembly of the town, where he served as his party speaker.

Torres Zamora ran for an election spot at the 2008 primaries but lost. However, in 2010, after Iris Miriam Ruíz was sworn in as Ombudswoman, Torres Zamora was called to fill the vacancy. He was sworn in on June 10, 2010.

At the 2012 primaries, Torres Zamora received the support of his party to run again for the House of Representatives. He was the candidate with the second-most votes, after incumbent Speaker Jenniffer González. However, he was defeated at the general election.

On December 26, 2012, Governor and President of the PNP Luis Fortuño appointed Torres Zamora as Secretary General of the party.

On June 6, 2016 Torres Zamora was elected as one of the six at-large representative candidates of the New Progressive Party to participate in the 2016 General Elections. He had the fourth-most votes in the primaries for at-large representative.

In the 2016 General Election Torres Zamora was elected as one of the 11 Puerto Rico at-large Representatives, with the sixth-most votes. Later the NPP Caucus elected Pichy Torres Zamora as the new Speaker Pro-Tempore of the Puerto Rico House of Representatives. He was sworn in on January 2, 2017 as Puerto Rico Representative and elected Speaker Pro Tempore on January 9, 2017.

Controversy
In early 2019, the people of the municipality of Loíza and others were offended and demanded an apology after Torres Zamora made a racist comment on an image of a black woman stating she was "as black as carbon.. you only find those in Loíza".

Personal life

Torres Zamora married Ivelisse Colon Berrios on March 7, 1998, they met at college in 1988 where their friendship began. From this union they raised two boys, Joseluis who born in 1998 and Felipe Antonio who born in 2007. They separated in 2013 and divorced in 2015 after 15 years.

Ivelisse Colon Berrios (Former Commissioner of Financial Institution of Puerto Rico) died on July 6, 2017; at that time he gained full custody of his two sons Joseluis Ernesto(19) and Felipe Antonio (10).

Today Pichy is a single dad rising his kids, studying at night and serving Puerto Rico from the House of Representatives as Deputy Speaker and from his party and Under Secretary.

References

External links
José Torres Zamora on tucamarapr.org

|-

1971 births
Living people
New Progressive Party members of the House of Representatives of Puerto Rico
New Progressive Party (Puerto Rico) politicians
People from Jayuya, Puerto Rico